Giovagnoli is a surname of Italian origin.

People with the surname include:
 Dalcio Giovagnoli (born 1963), Argentinian football coach and former player, currently managing Chilean club Curicó Unido
 Filippo Giovagnoli (born 1970), Italian football coach and former player, currently managing Irish club Dundalk
 Nicolás Giovagnoli (born 1998), Argentinian football player, currently for Comunicaciones
 Raffaello Giovagnoli (1838–1915), Italian writer and politician